Columbia College is a private liberal arts college in Columbia, South Carolina. Founded in 1854 by the United Methodist Church as a women's liberal arts college, Columbia College became fully coeducational in 2020 welcoming its first coed residential class in Fall 2021.  It also offers evening, graduate, and online programs for women and men.

History

Founded in 1854, it is one of the oldest women's colleges in the United States. Columbia Female College officially opened in 1859 with an initial student body of 121 and a faculty of 16. When General Sherman and his troops marched through Columbia in 1865, the school had to close.  It was saved from being torched only because Professor of Music W. H. Orchard, having heard that all unoccupied buildings would be burned by a certain hour, left his home to stand in the doorway of the college where he could be seen by the troops.  The school was reopened in 1873.  The college was damaged by its first fire in 1895, though the damage was not extensive.  The name changed to Columbia College in 1905 after it was moved to its present site in North Columbia in 1904.  Swept by a second fire in 1909, the college operated out of its former Plain Street facilities until the North Columbia campus could be reoccupied in 1910.

From 1940 to 1951, presidents Guilds and Greene oversaw Columbia College as well as Wofford College in Spartanburg, South Carolina.

In 1964, a third fire ravaged the campus, destroying Old Main, a college landmark. Frightened and disheartened students, huddled in the middle of the night in College Place Methodist Church, were told by President Spears, "Nothing has been destroyed that cannot be rebuilt." Soon thereafter new interest in the college was engendered, and building continued. The columns of Old Main, which had been the only thing left standing in the ashes when the fire was over, became a symbol of Columbia College, its strength and its endurance.

Georgia O'Keeffe taught art at Columbia College in 1914 and 1915.

During the 1980s, an evening college was established in which both female and male students could be educated.  Recently U.S. News & World Report has ranked Columbia College as one of the top regional liberal arts colleges in the South.

In 2011, the Carnegie Foundation for the Advancement of Teaching and the Council for Advancement and Support of Education (CASE) named Columbia College professor, Dr. John Zubizarreta “U. S. Professor of the Year” for undergraduate baccalaureate colleges. Zubizarreta is a professor of English and director of honors and faculty development for Columbia College. The Columbia College honors program has also produced two consecutive National Collegiate Honors Council Honor Students of the Year, Homa Hassan in 2009 and Diana Lynde in 2010.

On Jan. 31, 2020 the board of trustees voted for the plan to admit men to the college's residential day program. This is a significant change for Columbia College, which was founded in 1854 as Columbia Female College. This will not be the first time a man has studied at the college as male students have previously participated in co-ed evening, graduate and online programs, but this will be the first time men can study in a “co-ed residential day program.
Columbia College stated it made the change to enroll men as a result of “shifts in student demographics, cultural shifts and population trends.”

Athletics

The Columbia College athletic teams are called the Koalas. The college is a member of the National Association of Intercollegiate Athletics (NAIA), primarily competing in the Appalachian Athletic Conference (AAC) since the 2011–12 academic year. The Koalas previously competed in the Southern States Athletic Conference (SSAC; formerly known as Georgia–Alabama–Carolina Conference (GACC) until after the 2003–04 school year) from 2005–06 to 2010–11; and in the defunct Eastern Intercollegiate Athletic Conference (EIAC) during the 2004–05 school year.

Columbia College competes in 15 intercollegiate varsity sports: Men's sports include cross country, golf, soccer, swimming, tennis and track & field; while women's sports include basketball, cross country, golf, soccer, softball, swimming, tennis, track & field and volleyball. Men's sports debuted when the college became co-educational in 2020, beginning athletic competition in the 2021 fall season.

Alongside the addition of men's sports, Columbia College added Esports as a program within the institution. This includes Overwatch 2, Valorant, Rocket League, and Super Smash Bros Ultimate.

Notable alumnae
 Bettye Ackerman, actress
 Jenn Colella, comedian, actress, and singer
 Lucile Godbold, track and field athlete who won gold and bronze at the First International Games for Women, first woman inducted into SC Sports Hall of Fame, and annual touch football game named Ludy Bowl after her
 Wil Lou Gray, innovator in alternative education
Betty W. Holz, mathematician for the United States Army
 Alicia Leeke, artist
 Janice McNair, owner of Houston Texans
 Carol Devine Miller, member of the West Virginia House of Delegates and the US House of Representatives

References

External links
 Official website
 Official athletics website

 
Private universities and colleges in South Carolina
Education in Columbia, South Carolina
Former women's universities and colleges in the United States
Educational institutions established in 1854
History of women in South Carolina
Methodism in South Carolina
Universities and colleges accredited by the Southern Association of Colleges and Schools
Buildings and structures in Columbia, South Carolina
Women in South Carolina
1854 establishments in South Carolina
Appalachian Athletic Conference schools